Eva Hučková (born 18 November 1988) is a Slovak alpine skier. She competed in five events at the 2006 Winter Olympics.

References

1988 births
Living people
Slovak female alpine skiers
Olympic alpine skiers of Slovakia
Alpine skiers at the 2006 Winter Olympics
Sportspeople from Banská Bystrica